Westlake Village is a city in Los Angeles County on its western border with Ventura County. The City of Westlake Village incorporated in 1981 becoming the 82nd municipality of Los Angeles County. The population of the city was 8,029 at the 2020 census, down from 8,270 at the 2010 census.

The city is named after the master-planned community of Westlake that was later called Westlake Village to avoid confusion with the Los Angeles neighborhood of the same name. With a lake at the center, the community straddles the line between Los Angeles and Ventura counties. Roughly two-thirds of the community was previously annexed into the city of Thousand Oaks.

History
 About 3,000 years ago, Chumash Indians moved into the region and lived by hunting rabbits and other game, and gathering grains and acorns. On-going excavations, archaeological sites, and polychrome rock paintings in the area provide a glimpse into the social and economic complexity of the ancient Chumash world.

It is unknown when the first people settled in the area. A Chumash village was settled here in 500 BCE, known as Hipuc. The Chumash Indians gathered and prepared acorns and other seeds. These were collected in the fall. The Chumash also hunted wild animals, fish and gathered plants. Their diet consisted of acorns, gophers, cottontail rabbits, skunks, jack rabbits, rats, mice, and seeds. They made their clothing from the skins of animals such as rabbits, deer, and sea otters. Women wore long skirts woven from grass or soft bark, while men wore pieces of deerskin tied around their waists. Both men and women painted designs on their bodies and wore shell beads.

On a return trip from Northern California in January 1770, a group of men led by Gaspar de Portolá are believed to be the first Europeans to encounter the Chumash Indians in the Conejo Valley. Father Juan Crespí, chaplain and diarist of the expedition, wrote about  El Triumfo, a Chumash village. He wrote that there was plenty of water and firewood in the village, and that the land was covered with pastures. He wrote: "We are on a plain of considerable extent and much beauty, forested on all parts by live oaks and oak trees, with much pasturage and water." Crespí named the place El triunfo del Dulcísimo Nombre de Jesús (in English: The Triumph of the Sweetest Name of Jesus) to a camping place by a creek.

Other villages were found throughout the valley, including Satwiwa and two villages near Ventu Park Road in Newbury Park. These Chumash villages are believed by archeologists to have first been settled over 2,000 years ago. Another village was located by Lake Sherwood.

In 1795, the area became part of one of the first Spanish land grants, Rancho Simi, given to the Pico family of California. When Mexico won independence from Spain in 1821, Alta California became Mexican territory, and the Rancho Simi grant was confirmed in 1842.

At the time California was admitted to the union in 1850, most of the land that later became Ventura County was divided among only 19 families. Rising knolls, arroyos, barrancas and ancient oaks were found on two Mexican land grants: Rancho El Conejo and Rancho Las Virgenes.

In 1881, the Russell brothers purchased a large portion of the land for cattle ranching. According to Patricia Allen, historian and family descendant, Andrew Russell beat the competition in buying the land by racing across 6,000 acres (24 km) on a fifteen-minute trip in a buckboard and sealed the deal with a $20 gold piece. The price per acre was $2.50. The area continued to be known as the Russell Ranch although it was sold in 1925 to William Randolph Hearst and again in 1943 to Fred Albertson. The Russell family leased back part of the land to continue its successful cattle ranch operation while the Albertson Company used the vast area as a movie ranch. Many movies and television shows were filmed in the Conejo Valley, including Robin Hood, King Rat, Laredo, and various episodes of Tarzan, Buck Rogers, Gunsmoke and Bonanza. The 1940 film Danger Ahead was filmed on Westlake Boulevard.

In 1963, Daniel K. Ludwig's American-Hawaiian Steamship Company bought the 12,000 acre (49 km) ranch for $32 million and, in partnership with Prudential Insurance Company, commissioned the preparation of a master plan by architectural and planning firm A. C. Martin and Associates. This new "city in the country" planned to have a firm economic base including commercial areas, residential neighborhoods, and ample green space with the lake as a focal point.   Prominent architects, engineers, and land planners participated in designing the new community, a prominent example of planned 1960s-style suburbanism.

The original tract was divided by the Los Angeles/Ventura county line. In 1981, the Los Angeles County portion ( or roughly 1/3) of the Westlake master-planned community was incorporated as the City of Westlake Village. California state law prevents a city from existing in two separate counties.

Geography

In addition to being a bedroom community for Los Angeles via the Ventura (101) Freeway, it is also home to many large commercial offices and the headquarters of the Dole Food Company, K-Swiss and J.D. Power and Associates. The western region office (Region 5) of Anheuser-Busch Inc. is also located in the community. Pacific Coast Highway, and the Ronald Reagan (118) Freeway also run nearby. It is a short drive to the nearest mall in Thousand Oaks.

Much of Westlake Village is surrounded by open space, including hiking and horse trails, as well as the vast Santa Monica Mountains National Recreation Area. The town is in the northwestern Santa Monica Mountains area, and is 9 miles (14 km) inland from the Pacific Ocean. The area is within a wildlife corridor linking the Santa Monica Mountains with other undeveloped habitat. Mountain lions have been seen roaming the neighborhoods. The lake lies within the watershed of Malibu Creek. Water from the lake must be released into the creek in compliance with an agreement between the California State Water Resources Control Board and the Westlake Lake Management Association, a private entity that oversees the operation of the lake.

Westlake Village has several golf courses and country clubs: the Westlake Golf Course, Sherwood Country Club, and North Ranch Country Club.

Over one half of the original "Westlake" development lies west across the county line, wholly within the city limits of Thousand Oaks. This boundary which divides the Incorporated City of Westlake Village, and Thousand Oaks portion of Westlake Village, crosses over the Westlake Golf Course, halfway between Lakeview Canyon and Lindero Canyon roads, and half of the Lake itself. Lake Sherwood is nearby.

The City of Westlake Village is located approximately  West of downtown Los Angeles in the Conejo Valley. Other communities in the surrounding area include Thousand Oaks, Oak Park, Agoura Hills, Calabasas, Newbury Park, and Malibu.

Climate
Coastal breezes seep through canyons to allow Westlake to sometimes be up to 10 degrees cooler and considerably less hazy than nearby San Fernando Valley during the summer months. However, it generally remains 10 degrees hotter than the coastal plains below the Conejo Grade, in the communities of Santa Rosa Valley, Camarillo, and Ventura among others.

Demographics

2010
The 2010 United States Census reported that the self-incorporated portion of Westlake Village, on the Los Angeles County side, had a population of 8,270. The racial makeup of Westlake Village was 7,326 (88.6%) white (83.9% non-Hispanic white), 98 (1.2%) African American, 12 (0.1%) Native American, 490 (5.9%) Asian, 13 (0.2%) Pacific Islander, 114 (1.4%) from other races, and 217 (2.6%) from two or more races. Hispanic or Latino of any race were 533 persons (6.4%).

The Census reported that 8,142 people (98.5% of the population) lived in households, 121 (1.5%) lived in non-institutionalized group quarters, and 7 (0.1%) were institutionalized.

There were 3,262 households, out of which 971 (29.8%) had children under the age of 18 living in them, 1,985 (60.9%) were married couples living together, 292 (9.0%) had a female householder with no husband present, 119 (3.6%) had a male householder with no wife present.  There were 103 (3.2%) unmarried partnerships. 712 households (21.8%) were made up of individuals, and 376 (11.5%) had someone living alone who was 65 years of age or older. The average household size was 2.50.  There were 2,396 families (73.5% of all households); the average family size was 2.92.

The population was spread out, with 1,737 people (21.0%) under the age of 18, 479 people (5.8%) aged 18 to 24, 1,380 people (16.7%) aged 25 to 44, 2,917 people (35.3%) aged 45 to 64, and 1,757 people (21.2%) who were 65 years of age or older.  The median age was 48.7 years. For every 100 females, there were 94.8 males.  For every 100 females age 18 and over, there were 91.2 males.

The homeowner vacancy rate was 1.0%; the rental vacancy rate was 4.4%.  6,906 people (83.5% of the population) lived in owner-occupied housing units and 1,236 people (14.9%) lived in rental housing units.

According to the 2010 United States Census, Westlake Village had a median household income of $112,083, with 3.9% of the population living below the federal poverty line.

2000
As of the census of 2000, there were 8,469 people, 3,270 households, and 2,491 families residing in the city. The population density was 1,605.9 inhabitants per square mile (620.1/km). The racial makeup of the city was 89.70% White, 6.08% Asian, 0.82% African American, 0.13% Native American, 0.07% Pacific Islander, 1.02% from other races, and 2.17% from two or more races, plus one of California's largest communities for Russian American and American Jewish ancestral groups. Hispanic or Latino of any race were 4.61% of the population. Many locals (the Conejo Valley and Simi Valley region in general) were of Italian, Portuguese and Spanish ethnic origins. 

The median income for a household in the city was $120,089, and the median income for a family was $148,885. The per-capita income for the city was $137,355 in 2007, while the median home price was (as of 2007) $1,163,800.

There were 3,270 households, out of which 32.3% had children under the age of 18 living with them, 65.8% were married couples living together, 8.0% had a female householder with no husband present, and 23.8% were non-families. 19.3% of all households were made up of individuals, and 7.9% had someone living alone who was 65 years of age or older. The average household size was 2.56 and the average family size was 2.93.

In the city, the age distribution of the population showed 23.8% under the age of 18, 3.9% from 18 to 24, 23.1% from 25 to 44, 31.9% from 45 to 64, and 17.3% who were 65 years of age or older. The median age was 45 years. For every 100 females, there were 92.7 males. For every 100 females age 18 and over, there were 89.7 males. About 2.5% of families and 2.5% of the population were below the poverty line, including 1.6% of those under age 18 and 2.8% of those age 65 or over.

Economy
Dole Food Company is headquartered in Westlake Village. In 1994, Dole announced that it would finalize its plans to build its world headquarters on a  site owned by the company, located north of the Ventura Freeway in Westlake Village. The decision had been delayed by groundwater contamination tests and reviewing of possible site plan revisions. Dole was expected to submit its plans for final approval by the Westlake Village City Council on February 9, 1994. K-Swiss, Guitar Center, PennyMac Loan Services and Ryland Homes also have their headquarters in Westlake Village.

Top employers
According to the city's 2020 Comprehensive Annual Financial Report, the top employers in the city are:

Government
In the state legislature Westlake Village is located in California's 27th State Senate district, represented by Democrat Henry Stern, and in California's 44th State Assembly district, represented by Democrat Jacqui Irwin. Federally, Westlake Village is located in California's 26th congressional district, which has a Cook PVI of D +2 and is represented by Democrat Julia Brownley.

As of May 2009, 1,943 (33%) of the 5,876 registered voters in Westlake Village are registered as Democrats, 2,583 (44%) as Republicans, and 1,101 (19%) declined to state a party affiliation.

The Los Angeles County Sheriff's Department operates the Malibu/Lost Hills Station in Calabasas, serving Westlake Village.

Infrastructure
The Las Virgenes Municipal Water District supplies potable, recycled and wastewater services to residents and businesses in Westlake Village.

Education
The community is in the Las Virgenes Unified School District (LVUSD). Residents are zoned to White Oak Elementary School in Westlake Village, Lindero Canyon Middle School in Agoura Hills, and Agoura High School in Agoura Hills.

An off-campus center of California Lutheran University is located nearby in Thousand Oaks.

In popular culture

Westlake Village was home to Russell Ranch which was used to film Robin Hood (1922), Come On, Tarzan (1932), Buck Rogers (1939), King Rat (1965), Laredo (1965–67), Gunsmoke (1955–1975) and Bonanza (1959–1973). The Lash (1930) was also filmed at Russell Ranch, while Danger Ahead (1940) was shot on Westlake Boulevard. Baxter (GTE corporate headquarters at the time) was dubbed for a police station in the film Demolition Man (1993), while scenes from Gridiron Gang (2006) were shot at Westlake High School. Other movies filmed here include The Karate Kid (1984), American Pie (1999) and Bridesmaids (2011).

Two episodes of Charlie's Angels (1976–1981) were filmed in Westlake Village: The Killing Kind (1976) and Angel in a Box (1979).

Bonnie and Clyde (1967) features scenes from Skelton Canyon Road (Westlake Boulevard),
 while the TV series The FBI (1965–1974) was partly filmed at The Landing.

Recreation
Adjacent to Westlake Village is Santa Monica Mountains National Recreation Area, which offers nature trails for hikers, backpackers, mountain bikers, equestrians, picnickers, and campers.

Parks
Parks include:

Berniece Bennett
Canyon Oaks
Foxfield
Russell Ranch
Three Springs
Triunfo Creek Park
Westlake Village Community Park
Westlake Village Dog Park

Notable people 

 James Caviezel, actor
 Jimmy Clausen, Notre Dame and NFL quarterback
 Lenny Dykstra, baseball center fielder
Wayne Gretzky, hockey Hall of Famer
 Audley Harrison, 2000 Olympic heavyweight boxing champion from Great Britain
 Mariel Hemingway, actress
 Hulk Hogan, pro wrestler and actor
 Cobi Jones, former Los Angeles Galaxy soccer player
 Kathryn Joosten, actress
 Scarlett Keegan
 Hayley Kiyoko
 Martin Lawrence, comedian and actor
Mike Lieberthal, All Star and Gold Glove baseball catcher
 Jonathan Lipnicki, actor
 Heather Locklear, actress
 Maureen McCormick, actress, played Marcia Brady in the TV series The Brady Bunch
 Joe Montana, Hall of Fame quarterback
 Eddie Money, musician
 Alexis Neiers, television personality.
 John Ratzenberger, actor, best known as postal worker Cliff Clavin from '80s sitcom Cheers
 Kim Richards, child actress and television personality on Real Housewives of Beverly Hills
 Mickey Rooney, actor
 Bas Rutten, mixed martial arts fighter and actor
 Mike Scioscia, Major League Baseball player and manager
 George C. Scott, actor
 Vin Scully, voice of the Los Angeles Dodgers
Mike Seidman, NFL football player
Will Smith, musician and actor
Robert Stock (born 1989), MLB baseball player
Tommy Thayer, KISS lead guitarist
 Guillermo del Toro, film director
 Jered Weaver, former pitcher for the Los Angeles Angels
 Peter Weber, television personality
 Gary Wichard, college football player and professional sports agent
 Eric Wynalda, soccer player
 Christian Yelich, baseball player
 Robert Young, actor

References

External links
 
 WLVUnited — Opinion and information on New Developments in Westlake Village. Site includes Maps and Environmental Impact analysis.

 
Cities in Los Angeles County, California
Neighborhoods in Thousand Oaks, California
Conejo Valley
Planned cities in the United States
Planned communities in California
Populated places in the Santa Monica Mountains
Simi Hills
Incorporated cities and towns in California
Populated places established in 1981
1981 establishments in California